The Valley Connector Regional Shuttle and Commuter Bus was a public transportation service provided by S & W Tours, LLC and Valley Connector, Inc. that provided weekday commuter bus service in the United States from northern Shenandoah Valley to Northern Virginia and Washington, D.C. Commuter bus service was terminated on January 31, 2011. The termination happened due to declining passenger revenues.

With five regular scheduled routes daily, it served Shenandoah County, Warren County, Frederick County, Clarke County and the City of Winchester.

Origination points in Shenandoah County included Woodstock.  Origination points in Warren County included Front Royal and Linden.

Origination points in Frederick County, Clarke County and the City of Winchester area included the Waterloo Park-and-Ride and Berryville.

Destination points in Northern Virginia and Washington, D.C. included Arlington County and Fairfax County.

The routes included were 
 Route 46 Woodstock to Washington
 Route 48 Front Royal to Vienna Metro
 Route 57 Front Royal to Washington via Dulles Airport
 Route 69 Winchester to Washington

Other transit services in Northern Shenandoah Valley include Winchester Transit, Page County Transit, and Front Royal Area Transit.
Front Royal Area Transit (FRAT) provides weekday transit for the town of Front Royal.
Page County Transit: The People Movers provides weekday transit for the town of Luray and weekday service between Luray and Front Royal.
Winchester Transit provides weekday transit for the city of Winchester.

References

External links 
Shenandoah Valley Commuter Bus official site

Transportation in Shenandoah County, Virginia
Bus transportation in Virginia
Transportation in Warren County, Virginia
Transportation in Frederick County, Virginia
Transportation in Winchester, Virginia
Transportation in Page County, Virginia
Intercity bus companies of the United States
Transportation companies based in Virginia